Apfelberg (meaning "Apple Mountain" in German) is a former municipality in the district of Murtal in the Austrian state of Styria. Since the 2015 Styria municipal structural reform, it is part of the municipality Knittelfeld.

Geography
Apfelberg lies at the northern foot of the Gmeinberg (el. 818 m). It stretches from the southern edge of Knittelfeld to the foothills of the Gleinalp.

References

Cities and towns in Murtal District